Frederick Winslow Hatch (August 1, 1789 – January 14, 1860) was an Episcopal clergyman who served as Chaplain of the Senate of the United States.

Early years 
Frederick Winslow Hatch was born August 1, 1789, in Blandford, Massachusetts, the son of Lucretia Rockwell and Timothy Hatch.

Ministry 

Hatch was ordained a deacon by Bishop Thomas John Claggett in 1810.  He served in St. Paul's Episcopal Church in Edenton, North Carolina, (1811–1815) until he moved to All Saints' Church, Fredericktown, Maryland.

Hatch then served in Charlottesville, Virginia from 1820–1830, and while there, the original Christ Church was erected (1824-'25), this was the first denominational building in the village. The plan for the church was furnished, though not designed, by Thomas Jefferson, but it was demolished in 1895.  He also preached at Buck Mountain Episcopal Church and Walker's during this time.  The Hatch's home was about two miles down the road from Thomas Jefferson's Monticello.  Family members recalled waving to General Lafayette, James Madison and other revolutionary figures on their way to see the former President.

In 1830 Hatch became the rector of Washington Parish, District of Columbia. While there, he served as Chaplain of the Senate from 1833 until 1835.

In 1836 he moved to St. Paul's Church, Poughkeepsie, New York.

He was the first rector of St Matthew's Church in Kenosha, Wisconsin, (then called Southport) where he went with his family in 1843 and stayed till moving to California in 1856 to live near his son.

He died in Sacramento, California, on January 14, 1860. He is interred in the Sacramento Historic City Cemetery.

Personal life 

He married first, Frances Lowry Robertson in Baltimore in 1812; she died while they were in Edenton, North Carolina.  He married secondly, Mary Ann Weatherburn  They  had four children, two sons and two daughters.

References 

Chaplains of the United States Senate
1789 births
1862 deaths
People from Blandford, Massachusetts
Episcopalians from Massachusetts
19th-century American Episcopalians
American Episcopal clergy